Abbey104 (formerly known as Radio Sherborne) is a community radio station broadcasting on 104.7 FM to Sherborne and the surrounding areas in Dorset and Somerset in the United Kingdom. The studio is located at Coombe Works, Sherborne.

History 
The station was originally known as Radio Sherborne broadcasting on 87.5 FM (on an RSL) and Online. Radio Sherborne was later rebranded as Abbey104 in February 2013 broadcasting on 104.7 FM.

The idea of a local radio station for Sherborne was brought up in 2010 by Chris Tucker. He felt that the local community was neglected by broadcasters such as the BBC and commercial stations. This was most apparent in winter 2009-2010, where the area found itself in a news black spot for local weather and travel reports.

The station is proposed as a way to bring community views, news and music to people of the town and surrounding areas.

In 2010, the station received a National Lottery grant of £9000 which helped towards start-up costs. The station is well supported and sponsored by local traders in the area.
Oliver Letwin, a local MP, was invited to the official launch at the Eastbury Hotel, Sherborne along with representatives of the local Lions Club and Rotary Club.

Abbey104's 1st birthday broadcasting on 104.7 FM was celebrated with a special outside broadcast at Sainsbury's in Sherborne.

At the end of March 2014, Abbey104 ceased broadcasting from Georgian House, Greenhill, Sherborne, and moved to temporary studio premises at the Mermaid Pub in Sherborne, whilst the new studio was prepared at Coombe Works, Coombe, Sherborne.

In April 2014, the studios were moved from the temporary premises at the Mermaid and commenced at Coombe Works where the station broadcasts from today.

Since April 2022 the station is run by John Shearing as Chairman with Robert Ford Treasurer, And Susan Hill Secretary. Abbey104 has gone from strength to strength over last two years and becoming a much needed part of the community.
With Directors, Taff Martin and Kevin Gould.

In February 2018 Abbey104 was given a new 5 year extension to its licence, committing the station to serve the local community for the foreseeable future with a fantastic collection of old and new hits which are programmed when studios are unmanned to entertain the listener without the same tired collection of 80s hits other stations use.

Presenters on Abbey104 include Programme Controller Phil Clements, Taff Martin Country Show, Jenny Devitt Local World, Syd Guppy Eclectic Jukebox, Bob Ford Folk Show and Steve Bennett also hosts a great show every Tuesday from 2-4 with song requests, quizzes and name that year.

Transmission 
The main frequency for Abbey104 is on 104.7 MHz FM and emits 25 watts from a transmitter located at The Gryphon School, Sherborne. A STL is used to communicate between the studio in Coombe, to the transmitter site. The station broadcast range is approximately 12-15 mile radius around Sherborne. This includes Wincanton to the north and Cerne Abbas to the south, towards Martock to the west and Shaftesbury to the east.

References

External links
 Official website

Community radio stations in the United Kingdom
Radio stations in Dorset
Sherborne